The Journal of Transport Geography is a quarterly peer-reviewed scientific journal published by Elsevier in association with the Transport Geography Research Group of the Royal Geographical Society (with the Institute of British Geographers). The journal was established in 1993 and covers all aspects of transportation geography. The editor-in-chief is Frank Witlox. The founding editor is Richard Knowles (University of Salford).

Aims and scope 
The journal focuses on transportation geography research, methodologies, and data; covering associated investigations within government policies, infrastructure, area development, telecommunications, economic integration (global and regional), environment, energy resources, travel, tourism, geographical information systems, and spatial change.

Abstracting and indexing 
This journal is abstracted and indexed by:

According to the Journal Citation Reports, the journal has a 2016 impact factor of 2.675.

References

External links 
 
 Editor in the Spotlight – Richard Knowles. Elsevier's "Editor in the Spotlight". March 12, 2013. 

Elsevier academic journals
Geography journals
Quarterly journals
English-language journals
Publications established in 1993
Transportation journals